La Viña is a department located in Salta Province, in northwestern Argentina.

With an area of  it is one of the smallest departments of the province. It borders to the north with the departments of Cerrillos, and Rosario de Lerma, to the east with Capital Department, to the south with La Viña Department and to the west with the departments of Cachi and San Carlos.

Towns and municipalities
 Coronel Moldes
 La Viña
 Ampascachi
 Talapampa
 Cabra Corral
 El Carmen
 Osma
 Veinte de Febrero
 Saladillo

Hydrography 
The most important river in the department is the Guachipas also known in ots beginning as the Las Conchas. It flows to Embalse Cabra Corral.

References

External links 

 Departments of Salta Province website

Departments of Salta Province